The Grand Prix de Bruxelles was a horse race which initially held at Boitsfort Racecourse. It was a Group I race - FB 1,000,000 (in 1984) - 2,200 meters.

Palmarès from 1886 to 1986 
see : Thoroughbred Database GRAND PRIX DE BRUXELLES - BOITSFORT

Some famous winners 

 Finasseur, 1905
 Prince Rose, en 1931
 North Stoke, 1977

See also 
 GR I Grand Prix Prince Rose

References

Bruxelles